The currently deposed Greek royal family was the ruling family for the Kingdom of Greece from 1863 to 1924 and again from 1935 to 1973. 

It is a branch of the Danish royal family, itself a branch of the House of Glücksburg. The first monarch was George I, the second son of King Christian IX of Denmark. The current head of the family is Pavlos, who assumed the role upon the death of his father, former King Constantine II on 10 January 2023.

With the 1974 Greek republic referendum and Article 4 of the Constitution of Greece, all family members have been stripped of their honorific titles and the associated royal status. Many family members born after 1974 still use the titles "Prince of Greece" and "Princess of Greece" to describe themselves, but such descriptions are neither conferred nor legally recognised by the Greek state as nobility titles. The family accepts that these terms are not nobility titles, but rather personal identifiers.

Creation

After the overthrow in 1862 of the first king of the independent Greek state, Otto of Bavaria, a plebiscite in Greece was initiated on 19 November 1862, with the results announced in February the following year, in support of adopting Prince Alfred of the United Kingdom, later Duke of Edinburgh, to reign as king of the country. The candidacy of Prince Alfred  was rejected by the Great Powers. The London Conference of 1832 had prohibited any of the Great Powers' ruling families from accepting the crown of Greece, while Queen Victoria was opposed to such a prospect.

A search for other candidates ensued, and eventually, Prince William of Denmark, of the House of Glücksburg, the second son of King Christian IX and younger brother of the new Princess of Wales, was appointed king. The Greek Parliament unanimously approved on 18 March 1863 the ascension to the Greek throne of the prince, then aged 17, as King of the Hellenes   under the regnal name of George I. George arrived in Greece in October 1863.

History
George I married Grand Duchess Olga Constaninovna of Russia, and they had seven surviving children. After a reign of almost fifty years, George I was succeeded by his eldest son, Constantine I, who had married in 1889, Princess Sophia of Prussia, a granddaughter of Queen Victoria and sister of Kaiser Wilhelm II. In turn, all three of Constantine's sons, George II, Alexander and Paul, would occupy the throne.

The dynasty reigned in Greece during the Balkan Wars, World War I, World War II (during which Greece experienced occupation by the Axis), the Greek Civil War, and most of the Greek military junta of 1967–1974.

Following the National Schism during World War I and the subsequent Asia Minor Disaster, the monarchy was deposed in March 1924 and replaced by the Second Hellenic Republic. Between 1924 and 1935 there were twenty-three changes of government in Greece, a dictatorship, and thirteen coups d'etat. In October 1935, General Georgios Kondylis, a former Venizelist, overthrew the government  and arranged for a plebiscite to end the republic. On 3 November 1935, the official tally showed that 98% of the votes supported the restoration of the monarchy. The balloting was not secret, and participation was compulsory. As Time described it at the time, "As a voter, one could drop into the ballot box a blue vote for George II, or one could cast a red ballot for the Republic." George II returned to Greece on 25 November 1935, as King.

On 4 August 1936, the king endorsed the establishment of a government led by veteran army officer Ioannis Metaxas.

George II followed the Greek government in exile after the German invasion of Greece in 1941 and returned to Greece in 1946, after a referendum that resulted in the maintaining of the constitutional monarchy. He died in 1947 and was succeeded by his brother Paul. The new king reigned from the time of Greek civil war until his death in 1964, and was succeeded by his son, Constantine II.

Downfall
On 21 April 1967, the elected government of Greece was overthrown by a group of middle-ranking army officers led by Colonel Georgios Papadopoulos, and a military dictatorship was established.  The military junta formed a new government sworn in by Constantine II. On  13 December 1967, the king launched a counter-coup that failed and he, together with his family, fled to Rome and soon after to London.

The dictatorship nominally retained the monarchy but on 1 June 1973, Constantine II was declared "deposed," and Papadopoulos appointed himself "President of the Republic". Some two months later, on 29 July 1973, the military regime held a referendum, the official result of which confirmed, according to the junta, the abolition of the monarchy.

After July 1974, the dictatorship fell. The military handed power over to Konstantinos Karamanlis, a conservative politician who had been prime minister in the 1950s and early 60s. Karamanlis formed a "government of national unity" and held a constitutional referendum on 8 December 1974. The voters confirmed the abolition of the monarchy by a vote of 69% to 31% and the establishment of a parliamentary democracy in Greece.

Legal status
In the referendum of 1974, all members of the royal family were stripped of their titles  pursuant to article 4 of the Greek constitution; honorifics such as "prince" and "princess" are not officially recognised in Greece.

In 2013, after being declared personae non gratae in the 1980s, having the palaces of the family and other estates expropriated in 1994, and then their passports annulled,  Constantine II and his wife Anne-Marie  were once again living in Greece. Constantine II died on 10 January 2023, aged 82. He was succeeded by his son, Pavlos, Crown Prince of Greece, as the head of House of Glucksburg-Greece.

Royal coat of arms

The royal coat of arms still used by the royal family is a blue shield with the white cross of Greece with the greater coat of arms of Denmark of 1819–1903 in the centre. This was consequently also the arms of Denmark when the Danish prince William accepted the Greek throne as King  George I. As such this includes the three lions of the arms of Denmark proper, the two lions of Schleswig, the three crowns of the former Kalmar Union, the stockfish of Iceland, the ram of Faroe Islands, the polar bear of Greenland, the lion and hearts of the King of the Goths, the wyvern of the King of the Wends, the nettle leaf of Holstein, the swan with a crown of Stormarn, the knight on horseback of Dithmarschen, the horse head of Lauenburg, the two red bars of the House of Oldenburg and the yellow cross of Delmenhorst. The same shield is in the personal standard of the Kings of Greece. The shield is surmounted by two figures of Heracles, similar to the "wild men" of the Coat of arms of Denmark. The shield also has the Order of the Redeemer, while the royal motto reads " Ἰσχύς μου ἡ ἀγάπη τοῦ λαοῦ" ("The people's love is my strength").

Dynastic lineage
As male-line descendants of King Christian IX of Denmark, members of the dynasty bear the title of Prince or Princess of Denmark and thus are traditionally referred to as "Princes" or "Princesses of Greece and Denmark".

Members

Italicised names denote that the individual has died. Bolded names denote that the individual is/was the head of the royal house. Please note that any living members who are not directly descended from Paul I are considered extended family.

 George I of the Hellenes, who was born as a son of Christian IX and was elected as the first King of the Hellenes.
 Constantine I of the Hellenes
 George II of the Hellenes
 Alexander of the Hellenes
 Princess Alexandra of Greece and Denmark, who married Peter II of Yugoslavia
 Their descendants as members of the Yugoslavian royal family, including Alexander, Crown Prince of Yugoslavia
 Princess Helen of Greece and Denmark, who married Carol II of Romania
 Their descendants as members of the Romanian royal family, including Michael I and Margareta, Custodian of the Crown
 Paul I of the Hellenes
 Princess Sofía of Greece and Denmark, who married Juan Carlos I of Spain
 Their descendants as members of the Spanish royal family, including Felipe VI
 Constantine II of the Hellenes, who married Princess Anne-Marie of Denmark, daughter of Frederick IX 
 Princess Alexia, Mrs. Morales
 Arrietta Morales y de Grecia
 Anna-Maria Morales y de Grecia
 Carlos Morales y de Grecia
 Amelia Morales y de Grecia
 Pavlos, Crown Prince of Greece, who was born as the eldest son of Constantine and Anne-Marie. He is currently the head of the royal house and is married to Marie-Chantal Miller.
 Princess Maria-Olympia of Greece and Denmark
 Prince Constantine Alexios of Greece and Denmark, who was born as the eldest son of Pavlos and Marie-Chantal. He is the heir apparent to the royal house of Greece.
 Prince Achileas-Andreas of Greece and Denmark
 Prince Odysseas-Kimon of Greece and Denmark
 Prince Aristidis-Stavros of Greece and Denmark
 Prince Nikolaos of Greece and Denmark
 Prince Philippos of Greece and Denmark
 Princess Theodora of Greece and Denmark
 Princess Irene of Greece and Denmark
 Princess Irene of Greece and Denmark, who married Prince Aimone, Duke of Aosta
 Their descendants as members of the House of Savoy, including Prince Amedeo, Duke of Aosta, and Prince Aimone, Duke of Aosta
 Princess Katherine of Greece and Denmark
 Paul Brandram
 His descendants
 Prince George of Greece and Denmark
 Princess Eugénie of Greece and Denmark, who married Prince Dominik Radziwiłł and Raimundo, 2nd Duke of Castel Duino
 Their descendants, including Princess Tatiana Radziwiłł and Carlo Alessandro, 3rd Duke of Castel Duino
 Princess Alexandra of Greece and Denmark, who married Grand Duke Paul Alexandrovich of Russia
 Their descendants as members of the Russian royal family
 Prince Nicholas of Greece and Denmark
 Princess Olga of Greece and Denmark, who married Prince Paul of Yugoslavia
 Their descendants as members of the Yugoslavian royal family
 Princess Elizabeth of Greece and Denmark, who married Carl Theodor, Count of Törring-Jettenbach
 Their descendants as members of the House of Törring-Jettenbach
 Princess Marina of Greece and Denmark, who married Prince George, Duke of Kent, an uncle of Elizabeth II of the United Kingdom
 Their descendants as extended members of the British royal family, including Prince Edward, Duke of Kent, Prince Michael of Kent and Lady Gabriella Kingston
 Princess Maria of Greece and Denmark, who married Grand Duke George Mikhailovich of Russia and Perikles Ioannidis
 Princess Nina Georgievna of Russia
 David Chavchavadze
 Princess Maria Chavchavadze
 Yelena Rasic
 Princess Alexandra Chavchavadze
 Alexander Chavchavadze Ramani-Poduval
 Caroline Chavchavadze Ramani-Poduval
 Princess Catherine Chavchavadze
 Sophia Redpath
 Nina Nolan Redpath
 Prince Michael Chavchavadze
 David Chavchavadze
 Princess Olga of Greece and Denmark
 Prince Andrew of Greece and Denmark
 Princess Margarita of Greece and Denmark, who married Gottfried, Prince of Hohenlohe-Langenburg
 Their descendants as members of the House of Hohenlohe-Langenburg
 Princess Theodora of Greece and Denmark, who married Berthold, Margrave of Baden
 Their descendants as members of the House of Baden, including Maximilian, Margrave of Baden, and Bernhard, Margrave of Baden
 Princess Sophie of Greece and Denmark, who married Prince Christoph of Hesse and Prince George William of Hanover
 Their descendants as members of the House of Hesse and the House of Hanover
 Prince Philip, Duke of Edinburgh, who married Elizabeth II of the United Kingdom
 Their descendants as members of the British royal family, including Charles III
 Prince Christopher of Greece and Denmark
 Prince Michael of Greece and Denmark
 Princess Alexandra, Mrs. Mirzayantz
 Darius Mirzayantz
 Princess Olga, Duchess of Apulia, who married Prince Aimone, Duke of Aosta, her distant cousin
 Their descendants as members of the House of Savoy

Family tree of immediate members

Notes
* ''Member of the extended royal family

See also
 Timeline of modern Greek history
 List of kings of Greece
 Monarchy of Greece
 Tatoi Palace

Notes

References

External links
 Greek Royal family official website

 
 
History of modern Greece